In the New Testament, Jesus is referred to as the King of the Jews, both at the beginning of his life and at the end. In the Koine Greek of the New Testament, e.g., in John 19:3, this is written as Basileus ton Ioudaion.

Both uses of the title lead to dramatic results in the New Testament accounts. In the account of the nativity of Jesus in the Gospel of Matthew, the Biblical Magi who come from the east call Jesus the "King of the Jews", causing Herod the Great to order the Massacre of the Innocents. Towards the end of the accounts of all four canonical Gospels, in the narrative of the Passion of Jesus, the title "King of the Jews" leads to charges against Jesus that result in his crucifixion.

The initialism INRI represents the Latin inscription (in John 19:19), which in English translates to "Jesus the Nazarene, King of the Jews", and John 19:20 states that this was written in three languages—Hebrew, Latin, and Greek—during the crucifixion of Jesus.

The title "King of the Jews" is only used in the New Testament by gentiles, namely by the Magi, Pontius Pilate, and the Roman soldiers. In contrast, the Jewish leaders use the designation "Messiah". They use Hebrew words and did not say 'Christ', a Greek translation word. Although the phrase "King of the Jews" is used in most English translations, it has also been translated wrongly "King of the Judeans" (see Ioudaioi).

In the nativity

In the account of the nativity of Jesus in the Gospel of Matthew, the Biblical Magi go to King Herod in Jerusalem and (in Matthew 2:2) ask him: "Where is he that is born King of the Jews?" Herod asks the "chief priests and teachers of the law", who tell him in Bethlehem of Judea.

The question troubles Herod who considers the title his own, and in  he questions the Magi about the exact time of the Star of Bethlehem's appearance. Herod sends the Magi to Bethlehem, telling them to notify him when they find the child. After the Magi find Jesus and present their gifts, having been warned in a dream not to return to Herod, they returned to their country by a different way.

An angel appears to Joseph in a dream and warns him to take Jesus and Mary into Egypt (Matthew 2:13). When Herod realizes he has been outwitted by the Magi he gives orders to kill all the boys in Bethlehem and its vicinity who are two years old and under. (Matthew 2:16)

In the Passion narratives
In the accounts of the Passion of Jesus, the title King of the Jews is used on three occasions. In the first such episode, all four Gospels state that the title was used for Jesus when he was interviewed by Pilate and that his crucifixion was based on that charge, as in Matthew 27:11, Mark 15:2, Luke 23:3 and John 18:33.

The use of the terms king and kingdom and the role of the Jews in using the term king to accuse Jesus are central to the discussion between Jesus and Pilate. In , Jesus responds to Pilate, "you have said so" when asked if Jesus is the King of the Jews and says nothing further. In , he hints that the king accusation did not originate with Pilate but with "others" and, in John 18:36, he states: "My kingdom is not of this world". However, Jesus does not directly deny being the King of the Jews.

In the New Testament, Pilate writes "Jesus the Nazarene, King of the Jews" as a sign to be affixed to the cross of Jesus. John 19:21 states that the Jews told Pilate: "Do not write King of the Jews" but instead write that Jesus had merely claimed that title, but Pilate wrote it anyway. Pilate's response to the protest is recorded by John: "What I have written, I have written."

The continued reliance on the use of the term king by the Judeans to press charges against Jesus is a key element of the final decision to crucify him. In  Pilate seeks to release Jesus, but the Jews object, saying: "If thou release this man, thou art not Caesar's friend: every one that maketh himself a king speaketh against Caesar", bringing the power of Caesar to the forefront of the discussion. In , the Jews then cry out: "Crucify him! ... We have no king but Caesar."

The use of the term "King of the Jews" by the early Church after the death of Jesus was thus not without risk, for this term could have opened them to prosecution as followers of Jesus, who was accused of possible rebellion against Rome.

Here, after Jesus has carried the cross to Calvary and has been nailed to the cross, the soldiers look up on him on the cross, mock him, offer him vinegar and say: "If thou art the King of the Jews, save thyself."

King of the Jews vs King of Israel
In the New Testament, the "King of the Jews" title is used only by the gentiles, by the Magi, Pontius Pilate, and Roman soldiers. From Pilate's perspective, it is the term "King" (regardless of Jews or Israel) that is sensitive, for it implies possible rebellion against the Roman Empire.

In the Gospel of Mark the distinction between King of the Jews and King of Israel is made consciously, setting apart the two uses of the term by the Jews and the gentiles.

INRI and ΙΝΒΙ

The initialism INRI represents the Latin inscription , which in English translates to "Jesus the Nazarene, King of the Jews" (John 19:19). John 19:20 states that this was written in three languages — Hebrew, Latin and Greek – and was put on the cross of Jesus. The Greek version of the initialism reads ΙΝΒΙ, representing .

Devotional enthusiasm greeted the discovery by Pedro González de Mendoza in 1492 of what was acclaimed as the actual tablet, said to have been brought to Rome by Saint Helena, mother of Emperor Constantine.

Western Christianity
In Western Christianity, most crucifixes and many depictions of the crucifixion of Jesus include a plaque or parchment placed above his head, called a titulus, or title, bearing only the Latin letters INRI, occasionally carved directly into the cross and usually just above the head of Jesus. 
The initialism INRI (as opposed to the full inscription) was in use by the 10th century (Gero Cross, Cologne, ca. 970).

Eastern Christianity 
In Eastern Christianity, both the Eastern Orthodox Church and the Eastern Catholic particular churches sui iuris use the Greek letters ΙΝΒΙ, based on the Greek version of the inscription .

The Romanian Orthodox Church uses INRI, since abbreviation in Romanian is exactly the same as in Latin (Iisus Nazarineanul Regele Iudeilor)Eastern Orthodox Churches that use Church Slavonic in their liturgy use  (the equivalent of ΙΝΒΙ for ) or the abbreviation  ("King of Glory").

Versions in the gospels

Other uses of INRI

In Spanish, the word  denotes any insulting or mocking word or phrase; it is usually found in the fixed expression  (literally "for more/greater insult"), which idiomatically means "to add insult to injury" or "to make matters worse". Its origin is sometimes made clearer by capitalisation .

The initials INRI have been reinterpreted with other expansions (backronyms). In an 1825 book on Freemasonry, Marcello Reghellini de Schio alleged that Rosicrucians gave "INRI" alchemical meanings:
 Latin  ("by fire, nature renews itself"); other sources have 
 Latin   ("the nitre of dew is found by fire")
 Hebrew  (Yammīm, Nūr, Rūaḥ, Yabešet, "water, fire, wind, earth" — the four elements)
Later writers have attributed these to Freemasonry, Hermeticism, or neo-paganism. Aleister Crowley's The Temple of Solomon the King includes a discussion of Augoeides, supposedly written by "Frater P." of the A∴A∴:
For since Intra Nobis Regnum deI [footnote in original: I.N.R.I.], all things are in Ourself, and all Spiritual Experience is a more of less complete Revelation of Him [i.e. Augoeides].
Latin  literally means "Inside Us the Kingdom of god".

Leopold Bloom, the nominally Catholic, ethnically Jewish protagonist of James Joyce's Ulysses, interprets INRI as "Iron Nails Ran In".  The same meaning is given by a character in Ed McBain's 1975 novel Doors. Most Ulysses'' translations preserve "INRI" and make a new misinterpretation, such as the French  "he makes us innocent again".

Isopsephy

In isopsephy, the Greek term receives a value of 3343 whose digits seem to correspond to a suggested date for the crucifixion of Jesus, (33, April, 3rd day).

Gallery

Biblical scenes

INRI examples

See also

 Christ (title)
 Christ the King
 Ichthys
 Jesus in Christianity
 Kings of Israel and Judah
 Names and titles of Jesus in the New Testament
 Sanhedrin trial of Jesus
 Titulus Crucis
 Trilingual heresy
 Related Bible parts: Matthew 2, Matthew 27, Mark 15, Luke 23, John 19

References

Notes

Citations

Sources

 

 

 
 
 
 
 
 
 
 

 

 
 
 

 
 
 

 
 
 

Christian terminology
Christology
Crucifixion of Jesus
Eschatology
Pontius Pilate